Majid Beheshti (born 22 October 1955) is an Iranian actor, film producer, and theater director. He has also acted in various Television series. He has garnered most of his popularity and fame from his participation in these programs.

Biography 
Majid Beheshti is an Iranian film and theater director who has directed many screen and stage plays since 1970. Since his childhood in the city of Kerman, he had a great interest in theater. He pursued his dream, which of course was to advance his academic degree in theater and Television. After high school he moved to the city of Tehran where he achieved his master's degree.
Beheshti, since entering university of Dramatic Arts of Tehran in 1978, practiced his drama skills under the supervision of some well-known professors such as: Dr. Roknedin Khosravi,  Hamid Samandarian, Dr. Hossein Parvaresh, and Behzad Farahani. In 1982, he started working at the Islamic Republic of Iran Broadcasting as a director and producer of many TV series and cinematic movies. He founded a magazine named Film & Art, based on Iranian film and cinema in 1999. However, he closed the magazine after seven years
. During his career, he produced and directed many well-known TV shows and movies for Islamic Republic of Iran Broadcasting, which were  broadcast on the National Television of Iran. He left Iran in 2005 and currently lives in the United Kingdom.

Partial works

References

 Majid Beheshti
 Majid Beheshti
 Majid Beheshti

External links
 
 
 Majid Beheshti in Omid Radio
 Beheshti in Iran Theatre
 Majid Beheshti in Festival of Arts
 Majid Beheshti

Living people
1955 births
Iranian theatre directors
Iranian film directors
Iranian male actors
Iranian emigrants to the United Kingdom
People from Kerman Province